The Grammy Award for Best Polka Album was an award presented at the Grammy Awards to recording artists for quality polka albums. Honors in several categories are presented at the ceremony annually by the National Academy of Recording Arts and Sciences of the United States to "honor artistic achievement, technical proficiency and overall excellence in the recording industry, without regard to album sales or chart position".

Originally called the Grammy Award for Best Polka Recording, the award was first presented to Frankie Yankovic in 1986. Previously, polka recordings had been placed in the folk category. While neither Billboard nor the Recording Industry Association of America tracked polka sales at the time the award category was introduced, polka musicians viewed its inclusion as a sign of respect and increasing popularity. In 1987, a tie vote resulted in awards being presented to Jimmy Sturr and His Orchestra for the album I Remember Warsaw as well as to Eddie Blazonczyk's Versatones for the album Another Polka Celebration. In 1992, the name of the category was changed to Best Polka Album. Beginning in 2001, award recipients included the producers, engineers, and/or mixers associated with the nominated work in addition to the recording artists. The Academy retired the award category in 2009 to remain "relevant and responsive" to the music community.

Sturr holds the record for the most wins in this category, with a total of eighteen (including six as the leader of the group known as Jimmy Sturr and His Orchestra). Sturr also holds the record for the most consecutive Grammy wins. Walter Ostanek received the award three times consecutively, and the band Brave Combo was presented the award twice. American artists were presented with the award more than any other nationality, though it was presented to Ostanek and his band from Canada three times. Lenny Gomulka holds the record for the most nominations without a win, with twelve.

Recipients

{| class="wikitable plainrowheaders sortable"
! scope="col" bgcolor="#efefef" |Year
! scope="col" bgcolor="#efefef" |Performing artist(s)
! scope="col" bgcolor="#efefef" |Work
! scope="col" bgcolor="#efefef" class=unsortable |Nominees
! scope="col" bgcolor="#efefef" class=unsortable |Ref.
|-
! scope="row" style="text-align:center;"|1986
| 
| 
| 
| style="text-align:center;"|
|-bgcolor="#CFECEC"
! scope="row" style="text-align:center;" rowspan=2|1987*
| Jimmy Sturr and His Orchestra
| 
| rowspan=2|
| style="text-align:center;" rowspan=2|
|-bgcolor="#CFECEC"
| Eddie Blazonczyk's Versatones
| 
|-
! scope="row" style="text-align:center;"|1988
| 
| 
| 
| style="text-align:center;"|
|-
! scope="row" style="text-align:center;"|1989 
| 
| 
| 
| style="text-align:center;"|
|-
! scope="row" style="text-align:center;"|1990 
| 
| 
| 
| style="text-align:center;"|
|-
! scope="row" style="text-align:center;"|1991 
| 
| 
| 
| style="text-align:center;"|
|-
! scope="row" style="text-align:center;"|1992 
| 
| 
| 
| style="text-align:center;"|
|-
! scope="row" style="text-align:center;"|1993 
| Walter Ostanek and His Band
| 
| 
| style="text-align:center;"|
|-
! scope="row" style="text-align:center;"|1994 
| Walter Ostanek and His Band 
| 
| 
| style="text-align:center;"|
|-
! scope="row" style="text-align:center;"|1995 
| Walter Ostanek Band
| 
| 
| style="text-align:center;"|
|-
! scope="row" style="text-align:center;"|1996 
| 
| 
| 
| style="text-align:center;"|
|-
! scope="row" style="text-align:center;"|1997 
| 
| 
| 
| style="text-align:center;"|
|-
! scope="row" style="text-align:center;"|1998 
| 
| 
| 
| style="text-align:center;"|
|-
! scope="row" style="text-align:center;"|1999 
| Jimmy Sturr and His Orchestra
| 
| 
| style="text-align:center;"|
|-
! scope="row" style="text-align:center;"|2000 
| Brave Combo
| 
| 
| style="text-align:center;"|
|-
! scope="row" style="text-align:center;"|2001 
| 
| 
| 
| style="text-align:center;"|
|-
! scope="row" style="text-align:center;"|2002 
| 
| 
| {{smalldiv|
 Brave Combo – Kick-Ass Polkas
 Eddie Blazonczyk's Versatones – ''Live and Kickin Lenny Gomulka and Chicago Push – Lenny Live
 Walter Ostanek and His Band – Happy Times}}
| style="text-align:center;"|
|-
! scope="row" style="text-align:center;"|2003 
| 
| 
| 
| style="text-align:center;"|
|-
! scope="row" style="text-align:center;"|2004
| 
| 
| 
| style="text-align:center;"|
|-
! scope="row" style="text-align:center;"|2005
| Brave Combo
| 
| 
| style="text-align:center;"|
|-
! scope="row" style="text-align:center;"|2006
| Jimmy Sturr and His Orchestra
| 
| 
| style="text-align:center;"|
|-
! scope="row" style="text-align:center;"|2007
| Jimmy Sturr and His Orchestra
| 
| 
| style="text-align:center;"|
|-
! scope="row" style="text-align:center;"|2008
| Jimmy Sturr and His Orchestra
| 
| 
| style="text-align:center;"|
|-
! scope="row" style="text-align:center;"|2009
| Jimmy Sturr and His Orchestra
| 
| 
| style="text-align:center;"|
|}
 Each year is linked to the article about the Grammy Awards held that year.

Category retirement
In 2009, the National Academy of Recording Arts and Sciences announced the retirement of the award category. President and CEO Neil Portnow stated that the Academy needed to do so in order to remain a "relevant and responsive" organization within a "dynamic music community". Polka musicians and fans were disappointed with the category elimination. Three-time award winner Walter Ostanek admitted he "[felt] sorry for the future artists" that would fail to be recognized by the Academy. Carl Finch of the group Brave Combo stated the following: "Having a polka category was the most important step to legitimacy that we could ever hope to achieve. To have that taken away, it's like it was all for nothing." Apart from ensuring that the "awards process remains representative of the current musical landscape", the Academy cited dwindling competition as one reason for the category retirement. Others speculated that Jimmy Sturr's eighteen wins led to the elimination. Due to the elimination of a polka-specific category, polka musicians are likely to submit recordings in the folk and world music categories.

In 2011, the Grammy Award organization announced a major overhaul of Grammy categories, lowering the number of awards from over 120 to just 78. Several regional American roots genres, such as Hawaiian music or Native American music, were combined in the new Best Regional Roots Music Album category, for which polka albums would also be eligible.

See also
 List of Grammy Award categories
 Polka in the United States
 Polka Hall of Fame
 International Polka Association

ReferencesGeneral  Note: User must select the "Polka" category as the genre under the search feature.Specific'''

External links
Official site of the Grammy Awards

 
1986 establishments in the United States
2009 disestablishments in the United States
Album awards
Awards disestablished in 2009
Awards established in 1986
Polka Album